Lucian Murgoci (born 25 March 1992) is a Romanian professional footballer who plays as a left-back for Liga III side Avântul Valea Mărului. In his career Murgoci played for teams such as: Oțelul Galați, Farul Constanța or SV Euerbach/Kützberg, among others.

References

External links
 
 

1992 births
Living people
Sportspeople from Galați
Romanian footballers
Association football defenders
Romania youth international footballers
Liga I players
ASC Oțelul Galați players
Liga II players
CS Sportul Snagov players
FCV Farul Constanța players
Romanian expatriate footballers
Expatriate footballers in Germany
Romanian expatriate sportspeople in Germany